The Clearwater Masonic and Grand Army of the Republic Hall is a historic building in Clearwater, Minnesota, United States, constructed in 1888.  It has served as a meeting hall for both a local Grand Army of the Republic (GAR) post, and a local Masonic Lodge, with commercial space on the ground floor.  It was listed on the National Register of Historic Places in 1979 under the name Clearwater Masonic Lodge–Grand Army of the Republic Hall for having local significance in the themes of architecture and social history. It was nominated for its association with the fraternal organizations of Clearwater and many other rural Wright County communities that, in the words of historian John J. Hackett, "provided leadership, direction, and contributions to the county's political, educational, patriotic, and social life."

History 
The building was constructed jointly by the A.C. Collins Grand Army of the Republic Post No. 112 and Clearwater Masonic Lodge No. 28.  The former was one of 192 GAR posts in Minnesota. The Masonic Lodge continues to meet in the building.

The meeting halls are on the second floor, while the ground floor is split into two units leased to commercial tenants for income, a common arrangement in the region.

See also 
 List of Masonic buildings in the United States
 National Register of Historic Places listings in Wright County, Minnesota

References

External links 
 Clearwater Lodge No. 28

1888 establishments in Minnesota
Buildings and structures in Wright County, Minnesota
Clearwater, Minnesota
Clubhouses on the National Register of Historic Places in Minnesota
Minnesota
Italianate architecture in Minnesota
Masonic buildings completed in 1888
Masonic buildings in Minnesota
Minnesota in the American Civil War
National Register of Historic Places in Wright County, Minnesota